The following outline is provided as an overview of and topical guide to academia:

Academia – nationally and internationally recognized establishment of professional scholars and students, working for the most part in colleges and universities, who are engaged in higher education and research.

Purposes of academia 

 Higher education
 Research

Branches of academia 

 Academic disciplines
 Doctoral studies

History of academia 

 History of academia

Academic positions 
 Academic administration
 Academic ranks
 Professor
 Tenure

Academic communication 
 Academic conference
 Academic publishing
 Academic journal
 Academic article
 Academic literature
 Academic writing
 Peer review
 Scholarly communication
 Journal ranking

Academic culture 
 Academic acceleration
 Academic dishonesty (Scientific misconduct)
 Academic discipline  (Scientific community)
 Academic degree
 Academic dress
 Academic inflation
 Academic mobility
 Bullying in academia
 Ivory tower
 Town and gown
 Scholarly method (Scientific method)

See also 
 Outline of education
 Outline of knowledge

References

External links 

 Academia.edu - Online community of academic scholars
  - Community Contributor of academic Harvard
 Academia and web 2.0
 An Academic costume code and an Academic ceremony guide
 Bibliography on the history of the university , provided by Palinurus: The Academy and the Corporation, a web site from the University of California, Santa Barbara
 'Magistri et Scholares' - Academic News and Resources

 
Academia
Academia